Little Roy (born Earl Lowe in Witfield Town, Kingston, Jamaica) is a Jamaican reggae artist.

Biography
Little Roy began his career at the age of 12 years in 1965 recording a few unsuccessful tracks with producers Coxsone Dodd and Prince Buster. He was the first to record a song with the word REGGAE with producer Prince Buster who named him Little Roy although the song was unsuccessful. He had his first number one hit with "Bongo Nyah" (1969)at the age of 16 years for Lloyd Daley ("the Matador"), the first song about the Rastafari movement to be successful commercially in Jamaica. For his song "Don't Cross the Nation" (1970), Little Roy worked with the Wailers and producer Lee "Scratch" Perry.He worked with the late Dennis Brown on the bass and Leroy Sibbles in the song 'Tribal War'. Starting in 1972, Roy worked with Maurice "Scorcher" Jackson and his brother Munchie. Roy recorded the songs "Tribal War" and "Prophecy" in the 1970s. The rhythm from "Prophecy" was used by Steely & Clevie in 1990, leading to a hit record by Freddie McGregor. Roy decided to re-issue some of his old material on an album titled Prophesy. A new album, Live On, was released in 1991, and he worked with Adrian Sherwood on the 1996 album Long Time. Roy released another album in 2005, Children of the Most High.

In May 2011 Little Roy collaborated with Prince Fatty and the Mutant Hi-Fi to record Sliver/Dive cover of Nirvana's early single. An album of Nirvana songs, Battle for Seattle, was released in September 2011 on Ark Recordings.

Discography
Studio albums
Tribal War (1975)
Columbus Ship (1981), Tafari/Copasetic
Prophesy (1989)
Live On (1991)
Long Time (1996), On-U Sound
Gregory Isaacs meets Little Roy (1996)
More From A Little (1999)
Children of the Most High (2005)
Heat (2010), Pharos
Battle for Seattle (2011), Ark (UK chart peak: #111)
Right Now (2016)

Compilations
Prophesy (1989), Tafari
Tafari Earth Uprising (1996), Pressure Sounds
Packin' House (1999), Pressure Sounds (Little Roy & Friends)

 Singles (partial)
1969 – Bongo Nyah/Bad Name (Little Roy and The Creations) (Camel, Randy's, Pama)
1969 – Without My Love/Here I Come Again (Little Roy and Winston Samuels) (Crab)
1970 – Scrooge/In The Days of Old (Camel)
1970 – You Run Come/Skank King (Camel)
1971 – Yester-Me Yester-You Yesterday/Yes Sir (Escort)
1977 – Prophecy (Morwell Esq)
1989 – Prophecy (Original Press)
2014 – Disaster and Signs (Tuff Scout)
2015 – The Right Way (Tuff Scout)

See also
List of reggae musicians
List of roots reggae artists

References

1953 births
Living people
Musicians from Kingston, Jamaica
Jamaican male singers
Jamaican reggae singers
Performers of Rastafarian music
Jamaican Rastafarians